KLZN is a class C radio station broadcasting out of Susanville, California.

History
KLZN began broadcasting on May 13, 2010.

References

External links

Lassen County, California
2012 establishments in California
LZN
Radio stations established in 2012